Boljenovići  is a village in Croatia. It is located along the D414 state road in the south of the country. Administratively Boljenovići are part of the Ston municipality within the Dubrovnik-Neretva County.

American bare-knuckle boxer Nick Burley (Nicholas Barovich), Heavyweight Champion of the Yukon Territory in 1902, comes from this village.

References

External links 

Populated places in Dubrovnik-Neretva County